The general election for mayor of Alexandria, Virginia, was held on November 6, 2012. Incumbent mayor Bill Euille was successfully reelected to a fourth term.

Primaries
No primaries were held and Bill Euille was renominated without opposition.

General election
In the general election, Euille faced Andrew Macdonald.  Macdonald had previously served as a Democratic member of the city council between 2003 and 2007 and had run as an independent candidate in 2000. Despite being elected vice mayor by receiving the most votes in the 2006 election, Macdonald resigned from the council in 2007 for personal reasons. In March 2012, Macdonald appeared before the Alexandria Republican Committee and asked for their support in a potential bid for Mayor. Known for his anti-development views, Macdonald said he would make opposition to development on Alexandria's waterfront central to his campaign. Macdonald opposed the project both on environmental grounds while he also charged that Euille had business relationships with current waterfront tenants. Republicans responded favorably to Macdonald's appearance, with Republican Vice Mayor Bill Cleveland saying "I'm voting for anybody but Bill Euille." Several days later, following a confrontation with Alexandria Democratic Committee leadership, Macdonald resigned his membership in the Democratic Committee. On March 9, Macdonald officially announced his run for mayor as an independent.

Though defeated, Macdonald won majorities of the vote in two of the three precincts that bounded on the waterfront area.

References

2015
2012 United States mayoral elections
2012 Virginia elections